Henrik Porkka (born 14 January 1998) is a Finnish volleyball player for LEKA Volley and the Finnish national team.

He participated at the 2017 Men's European Volleyball Championship.

References

1998 births
Living people
Finnish men's volleyball players